Gammatorquevirus is a genus of viruses in the family Anelloviridae, in group II in the Baltimore classification. It contains 15 species. The fifteen species are all named "torque teno midi virus" (TTMDV), number 1–15.

Taxonomy
The genus contains the following species:

Torque teno midi virus 1
Torque teno midi virus 2
Torque teno midi virus 3
Torque teno midi virus 4
Torque teno midi virus 5
Torque teno midi virus 6
Torque teno midi virus 7
Torque teno midi virus 8
Torque teno midi virus 9
Torque teno midi virus 10
Torque teno midi virus 11
Torque teno midi virus 12
Torque teno midi virus 13
Torque teno midi virus 14
Torque teno midi virus 15

Discovery
TTMDV, which stands for transfusion transmitted midi virus or torque teno midi virus was first isolated in 2005 from patients with an acute viral infection syndrome.

Because of the circular nature of its DNA genome, TTMDV (which was provisionally named small anellovirus 1) was classified as an anellovirus. Genomic analysis confirmed this classification.

Like other anelloviruses, TTMDV is quite common, even in healthy individuals. It has been found in various bodily fluids, including saliva and nasopharyngeal aspirates.

Genome and capsid
Like other members of its family, TTMDV's genome is a circular single-stranded piece of DNA of a negative polarity. The genome is approximately 3.2 kb in length, which is slightly smaller than that of TTV and slightly larger than that of TTMV. It is a non-enveloped virus with a capsid about 40 nm in diameter.  The capsid possesses T=1 icosahedral symmetry.

Clinical
The pathogenic effects of TTMDV in humans is not known. However, it has been isolated from diarrhea cases.

References

External links
 ICTV Virus Taxonomy 2009  
 UniProt Taxonomy 
 
 ICTVdb
 ViralZone: Gammatorquevirus

Anelloviridae
Virus genera